KJN or kjn may refer to:

 KJN, the Indian Railways station code for Kannauj railway station, Uttar Pradesh, India
 kjn, the ISO 639-3 code for Oykangand language, Australia